Sutherland's River (Scottish Gaelic: Abhainn an t-Sutharlanaich) is a community in the Canadian province of Nova Scotia, located in  Pictou County .

Navigator

References
Sutherland's River on Destination Nova Scotia

Communities in Pictou County
General Service Areas in Nova Scotia